A Monster Calls is a play based on the low fantasy novel of the same name by Patrick Ness, from an original idea by Siobhan Dowd. The play was devised by the original company with Adam Peck as the writer in the room.

Production history 
The play opened at the Bristol Old Vic from 31 May to 16 July, before transferring to The Old Vic, London from 7 July to 25 August 2018. The production was directed by Sally Cookson, who is known for directing classic pieces using the devising process, following her productions of Jane Eyre, Peter Pan and La Strada.

The play began a tour of the UK from February 2020 opening at the Chichester Festival Theatre and was due to tour until June 2020 (followed by a run at the Eisenhower Theatre at The Kennedy Center, Washington, D.C. from July 21 to August 9, 2020), however due to the COVID-19 pandemic the remainder of the tour and Washington DC run was cancelled from March 2020.

An archive recording of a performance featuring the original Old Vic cast will be broadcast on YouTube from Friday 5 until Thursday 11 June 2020 as the first part of the Your Old Vic project, showcasing archive performances since Matthew Warchus' became artistic director in 2015.

Cast and characters

Reception 
The play won the 2019 Olivier Award for Best Entertainment and Family.

References 

Blooming Grove High School One Act Play- State Qualifiers.

Waxahachie High School One Act Play 
State Qualifiers.

External links 

 Official UK tour website

2018 plays
Plays based on novels
British plays
Laurence Olivier Award-winning plays